The Atlantic is a one-design keelboat, designed by Starling Burgess in 1928. It is a 30-foot open-cockpit day sailer, typically used for day racing, rather than for overnight or ocean races. In the years following its design, fleets were established in several US ports along the eastern seaboard.

Today, the Atlantic is raced primarily in Long Island Sound and in coastal Maine, and boats are distributed among five fleets, with a total of approximately 50 boats in present use.

Production
The design has been built by Cape Cod Shipbuilding and Seafarer Yachts in the United States, as well as by Abeking & Rasmussen in Bremen, Germany.

Design
In 1928, Starling Burgess, then a well-known naval architect age 50, decided to try to design and establish a one-design sailboat that would be raced in fleets along the eastern seaboard of the United States. Working with German boat yard Abeking & Rasmussen, he designed a prototype which he showed to yacht clubs along the east coast. The initial cost of the boat was $1800, below that of competing boats.

The Atlantic is a racing keelboat, with early examples built predominantly of wood and later ones from fiberglass, with wood trim. It has a fractional sloop rig; a raked stem; a raised counter, angled transom; an open cockpit with no cabin; a keel-mounted rudder controlled by a tiller and a fixed fin keel. It displaces  and carries  of ballast.

Operational history
The boat is supported by an active class club that organizes racing events, the Atlantic Class Association.

In 1930, there were 99 Atlantics, sailing in 13 fleets along Long Island Sound, the south shore of Long Island, Narragansett Bay, and Maine.

Three Atlantic sailors went on to win as skippers on America's Cup boats: Briggs Cunningham, Bus Mosbacher, and Bob Bavier.

In 1953, the Atlantic Class rules committee approved a rule change that allowed the reconstruction of the plank-on-frame Atlantics using fiberglass. The conversions were to be performed by Cape Cod Shipbuilding. Twenty boats were rebuilt using fiberglass between 1956 and 1958,, and since then nearly all existing boats have been converted. In addition, fifty new Atlantics have been built using fiberglass.

The Atlantic fleet remains active; its two largest-ever Nationals (with 41 boats each) were held in 1947 and 2012.

In a 1994 review Richard Sherwood wrote, "the original boats were built of wood during the twenties, and the boat was popular on Long Island Sound, where many famous names in sailing — Cunningham, Mosbacher, Romagna, Bavier, Shields, etc. — raced the boat. Later, the wooden hulls were replaced with FRP, with the original keels, spars, rudder and rigging transferred to the new hulls, Beginning in 1962, the boat was built totally new. A few boats have been modified for cruising and have a small deckhouse, with a Vee berth, a sink, and a head. "

Fleets 
 Cedar Point Yacht Club (YC) - 18 boats
 Cold Spring Harbor YC - 9 boats
 Kollegewidgwok YC - 21 boats
 Niantic Bay YC - 9 boats

References 

Sailing yachts
Keelboats
1920s sailboat type designs
Sailboat type designs by American designers
Sailboat types built by Abeking & Rasmussen
Sailboat types built by Cape Cod Shipbuilding
Sailboat types built by Seafarer Yachts